Institute for Nuclear Research of the Russian Academy of Sciences (INR RAS) is a Russian scientific research center "for further development of the experimental base and fundamental research activities in the field of atomic nucleus, elementary particle and cosmic ray physics and neutrino astrophysics".

It was founded in 1970 by the Decree of the USSR Council of Ministers. Located in Moscow, Russia near the Moscow State University and in Troitsk.

The institute is a founder of the Baksan Neutrino Observatory, the Baikal Deep Underwater Neutrino Telescope (Lake Baikal) and the former Artemovskaya Scientific Station (Soledar, Ukraine).

About 1,300 specialists including 5 academicians and 2 corresponding members of the RAS, 42 doctors and 160 candidates of science work in the institute.

Directors 
 Albert Nikiforovich Tavkhelidze, academician of RAS (1970–1986)
 Viktor Anatolyevich Matveev, academician of RAS, head of the Presidium of the Scientific Center of RAS in Troitsk (1987–2014)
 Leonid Vladimirovich Kravchuk (since 2015)

See also
Vladimir Lobashev
Joint Institute for Nuclear Research

References

External links
 INR RAS Website
 Portal of INR RAS in Moscow
 Portal of INR RAS in Troitsk

Nuclear research institutes in Russia
1970 establishments in the Soviet Union
Institutes of the Russian Academy of Sciences
Nuclear technology in the Soviet Union
Research institutes in the Soviet Union
1970 in science
Troitsk Settlement